Michael Cogdill (born George Michael Cogdill, June 11, 1961) is an American Journalist, Anchor, Novelist, Screenwriter, and Film producer.
His work as a journalist has appeared on NBC’s Today Show, CNBC, MSNBC, and CNN. He has been the recipient of 30 Emmys and a National Edward R. Murrow Award.

Early life
Cogdill was born in Asheville, North Carolina, the son of a truck driver and a mill worker.
His earliest jobs included mowing lawns, cleaning horse stalls, and working as a production assistant on film sets. He graduated from North Buncombe High School in Weaverville, North Carolina in 1979 and then graduated cum laude from the University of North Carolina at Asheville in 1984, earning a BA degree in communications (with an emphasis on the liberal arts).

Early Television Career
Two weeks after college graduation, Cogdill began his career in television, working at WECT, an NBC affiliate in Wilmington, North Carolina. He soon moved over to WWAY, Wilmington's ABC station,
and later migrated to CBS-aligned WRDW-TV in Augusta, Georgia. He finally landed at Greenville, South Carolina station WYFF (an NBC affiliate) in 1989, where he cemented his position as, arguably, the most decorated anchor man in South Carolina television history.

National Acclaim
Cogdill first rose to prominence when he reported on the story of Susan Smith, a Union, South Carolina woman convicted of murdering her two young sons in 1994 (after initially claiming that an African-American man had carjacked her and kidnapped the children). Cogdill’s Susan Smith: A Question of Justice (1996) garnered an Emmy, leading to appearances on such outlets as NBC’s Today Show, CNBC, MSNBC, and CNN.

Books
Cogdill is the author of  She-Rain, a novel set in rural western North Carolina in the 1920s.

Film
It was announced in 2014 that filmmaker Richard O'Sullivan had adapted She-Rain as a screenplay and that plans to produce the property as a feature film were in development (with Cogdill's film and television production company HeartStrong Media serving as a producing partner).

Awards
In addition to winning the National Edward R. Murrow Award and 30 Emmys, Cogdill has garnered the South Carolina Broadcasters Association Star Award, a South Carolina Television Journalist Award, and is a multiple-time winner of the Radio and Television News Director Association of the Carolinas Award.

External links
Michael Cogdill’s Official Site
Michael Cogdill’s IMDb Profile

References

1961 births
Living people
21st-century American novelists
American television reporters and correspondents
21st-century American non-fiction writers